Small nucleolar RNA, C/D box 71 is a protein that in humans is encoded by the SNORD71 gene.

References

Further reading